O'Connell is a suburb of Gladstone in the Gladstone Region, Queensland, Australia. In the  O'Connell had a population of 317 people.

Geography
Toolooa railway station is an abandoned railway station on the North Coast railway line.

The northern arm of the estuary of the Boyne River forms part of the eastern boundary.

Road infrastructure
Gladstone–Benaraby Road (State Route 58) closely parallels much of the eastern boundary before passing through the south-eastern corner.

History 
The suburb is named after Sir Maurice Charles O'Connell who was the Government Resident at Port Curtis from 1854 to 1859. In 1860 (after the Separation of Queensland) O'Connell was appointed a member of the Queensland Legislative Council and was its President from 1860 to 1879.

In the  O'Connell had a population of 317 people.

References 

Suburbs of Gladstone